Adrian Smiseth Sejersted (born 16 July 1994) is a Norwegian World Cup alpine ski racer, and specializes in the speed events of downhill and super-G.

At the Junior World Championships, he finished eighth and ninth in 2012, followed by a bronze medal in super-G in 2013. In 2014 he improved further, first to a silver medal in super combined before he won the downhill.

Sejersted made his World Cup debut in March 2014 in Lenzerheide, where he also collected his first World Cup points with a 14th-place finish. His first top ten came in December 2016, and first podium in December 2020.

He represents the sports club Stabæk IF, and is the younger brother of retired ski racer, Lotte Smiseth Sejersted.

World Cup results

Season standings

Race podiums
 0 wins
 2 podiums - (2 SG); 16 top tens

World Championship results

Olympic results

References

External links
 
 
 
 

1994 births
Living people
Sportspeople from Bærum
Norwegian male alpine skiers
Alpine skiers at the 2022 Winter Olympics
Olympic alpine skiers of Norway